The Southern Region of Malawi is an area of Malawi. It covers an area of 31,753 km². Its capital city is Blantyre. In 2018, its population was 7,750,629.

Of the 28 districts in Malawi, 13 are located within the Southern Region. They are: Balaka, Blantyre, Chikwawa, Chiradzulu, Machinga, Mangochi, Mulanje, Mwanza, Neno, Nsanje, Phalombe, Thyolo, and Zomba.

Demographics
At the time of the 2018 Census of Malawi, the distribution of the population of the Southern Region by ethnic group was as follows:
 39.3% Lomwe
 24.9% Yao
 8.3% Ngoni
 8.2% Sena
 6.8% Mang'anja
 6.6% Chewa
 3.8% Nyanja
 0.9% Tumbuka
 0.4% Tonga
 0.1% Nkhonde
 0.0% Lambya
 0.0% Sukwa
 0.7% Others

References

 
Regions of Malawi